Anil Beephan Jr. is an American politician and businessman who is a member of the New York State Assembly, representing the 105th district. His district comprises parts of Dutchess County. Prior to his election to the assembly in 2022, Beephan served as a councilman in East Fishkill. He is the first Republican of Indian descent to serve in the State Assembly.

Career 

Beephan's hometown is Hopewell Junction, New York.

Beephan graduated from Arcadia University in Pennsylvania and later earned a master's degree from Harvard Extension School.

Before entering politics, Beephan worked as a public relations and marketing strategist. He has worked in different legislative roles for New York State Senator Sue Serino. Prior to his election to the state assembly, Beephan served as a councilman in the town of East Fishkill.

2022 General Election 
Beephan announced his candidacy for New York's 105th Assembly District in October 2021. He won the general election on November 8, 2022, with 60.4% of the vote. Beephan assumed office on January 1, 2023.

Personal life 
Beephan is a private pilot. He also served as a lieutenant and volunteer firefighter for East Fishkill Fire District.

References 

Living people
Republican Party members of the New York State Assembly
21st-century American politicians
Year of birth missing (living people)
Harvard Extension School alumni
Harvard University alumni
Arcadia University alumni
Indian American
Indian Christians